The Lineup: The World's Greatest Crime Writers Tell the Inside Story of Their Greatest Detectives is a book written by Otto Penzler and published by Little, Brown and Company (now owned by Hachette Book Group) on 10 November 2009 which later went on to win the Edgar Award for Best Critical / Biographical Work in (2010)

References 

Edgar Award-winning works